Yost is an anglicized spelling of the Dutch name "Joost" or German surname "Jost".


Notable people

Government
Charles Woodruff Yost (1907–1981), American diplomat
Dave Yost (born 1956), American lawyer and politician and Ohio State Auditor
Ellis Asby Yost (1872-1962), American lawyer and West Virginia state senator for whom the prohibitionist "Yost Law" of 1913 is named - married to Lenna Lowe Yost, president of both the WVa Woman's Christian Temperance Union and the WVa Equal Suffrage Association
Jacob Senewell Yost (1801–1872), American politician and Pennsylvania Representative
Jacob Yost (Virginia congressman) (1853–1933), American politician and Virginia Representative
Joseph R. Yost (born 1986), American politician, Virginia state delegate
Paul A. Yost Jr. (born 1929), American Coast Guard Commandant
 Thomas B.Yost, Federal Judge -United States Environmental Protection Agency

Media
Casper Yost (1864–1941), American newspaper editor
Christopher Yost (born 1973), American film and animation screenwriter
David Yost (born 1969), American actor
Dennis Yost, lead singer of the American pop group Classics IV
Dorothy Yost (1899–1967), American screenwriter
Elwy Yost (1925–2011), Canadian television host
Gary Yost (born 1959), American filmmaker and software designer
Graham Yost (born 1959), Canadian film and television screenwriter
Hebert Yost, birth name of Barry O'Moore (1879–1945), American silent film actor

Sports
Eddie Yost (1926–2012), American baseball player and coach
Fielding H. Yost (1871–1946), American football player and coach
Gus Yost, American baseball player
Ned Yost (born 1954), American baseball player and manager
Nick Yost (1915–1980), American basketball player

Other
David S. Yost (born 1948), American academic and author on international relations
Gilbert Yost, American criminal
Joseph W. Yost (1847–1923), American architect
Michèl Yost (1754–1786), French musician, teacher, and cofounder of the French clarinet school
Paul Edward Yost (1919–2007), American inventor of the modern hot air balloon

References